The Oreos 2X is a 22-places electric low-floor minibus of the Gepebus line, made by Power Vehicle Innovation. The Oreos 2X is among the first electric transportation vehicles of this kind to be produced in France. Entirely electric, this minibus lowers the environmental impact of transport for local authorities or private actors in need of this kind of vehicle.

Technical characteristics 
 Maximal speed: more than 
 Range: 
 Energy recovery rate (during brake or deceleration phases) : around 20%
The Oreos 2X uses lithium-ion batteries which can be recharged without the use of a battery charger, because this charger is included in the bus.

Equipment 
The Oreos 2X has been designed for the transportation of a maximum number of 22 people, including 13 seated places.
The bus can also be equipped with a disabled people access system.

Operation 
Oreos 2X are running in the public transport network of the cities of Provins (Seine-et-Marne, France) operated by Procars, and in the city of Chevreuse (Yvelines, France), operated by SAVAC.

See also 

 Electric bus
 Oréos 4X
 Gepebus
 Power Vehicle Innovation
 List of buses

External links
 The Oréos 2X on PVI's website
 Procars.com
 Savac.fr

References 
 

Battery electric buses
Minibuses
Low-floor buses